WRAY-TV (channel 30) is a religious television station licensed to Wake Forest, North Carolina, United States, serving the Research Triangle region as an owned-and-operated station of Tri-State Christian Television (TCT). The station's transmitter is located on Terrells Mountain near Chapel Hill. WRAY-TV maintained studios on Expressway Drive in Wilson until TCT ended local operations in June 2018.

History
The station was given the call letters WEOU on February 18, 1992. However, the station was granted a license on April 14, 1995. It signed on August 7 as WRAY-TV, originally licensed to Wilson, North Carolina, and was initially a semi-satellite of WFAY (channel 62; now WFPX-TV), at that time Fayetteville's Fox affiliate; however, the station operated as an independent station, as its signal overlapped with WLFL, at that time Raleigh's Fox affiliate. WRAY's programming changed more towards home shopping upon its sale to Ramcast Corporation in 1997; Ramcast quickly merged with the Global Shopping Network to become Global Broadcasting Systems, Inc. However, Global Broadcasting Systems soon ran into financial trouble, and filed for Chapter 11 bankruptcy on June 26, 1997. Its assets, including WRAY, were sold to the rival Shop at Home Network in 1998.

On May 16, 2006, Shop at Home parent The E. W. Scripps Company announced that the network would be suspending operations, effective June 22, 2006. However, it temporarily ceased operations on June 21, and WRAY switched to Jewelry Television (and, on June 23, a mixture of both networks), which remained until Scripps found a buyer for its stations.

On September 26, 2006, Scripps announced that it was selling its Shop at Home stations, including WRAY, to Multicultural Television of New York City for $170 million. The sale of WRAY and sister stations KCNS in San Francisco and WOAC in Cleveland was completed on December 20, 2006. Soon after the sale, all Shop at Home programming ceased in favor of a schedule consisting primarily of infomercials.

After Multicultural ran into financial problems and defaulted on its loans, the station was placed into a trust; in October 2009, a sale of WRAY-TV to Marion, Illinois–based Tri-State Christian Television (via subsidiary Radiant Light Ministries, which had earlier acquired WOAC (now WRLM) from the trust), a chain of Christian television stations, was announced.

On April 4, 2017, WRAY was identified by the FCC as receiving $41 million for the spectrum reallocation auction. WRAY changed its city of license to Wake Forest, North Carolina and entered into a channel-sharing arrangement with WUNC-TV, along with sister station WLXI. With the 2018 FCC repeal of the Main Studio Rule, WRAY-TV's studio in Wilson was closed as part of a nationwide restructuring of TCT's operations into one hub from its Illinois base.

Technical information

Subchannel

Analog-to-digital conversion 
WRAY-TV discontinued regular programming on its analog signal, over UHF channel 30, on February 17, 2009, the original target date in which full-power television stations in the United States were to transition from analog to digital broadcasts under federal mandate (which was later pushed back to June 12, 2009). The station's digital signal continued to broadcasts on its pre-transition UHF channel 42. Through the use of PSIP, digital television receivers display the station's virtual channel as its former UHF analog channel 30.

References

External links 

Wake Forest, North Carolina
Television channels and stations established in 1995
1995 establishments in North Carolina
RAY-TV
Tri-State Christian Television affiliates